Ibragim Risoyevich Khasanov (4 November 1937 – 2 March 2010) was a Soviet sprint canoer, born in Stalinabad, who competed in the early to mid-1960s. Competing in two Summer Olympics, he earned his best finish of fourth in the K-1 1000 m event at Rome in 1960. Khasanov won a silver medal in the K-1 4 x 500 m event at the 1963 ICF Canoe Sprint World Championships in Jajce. He was a member of the Dushanbe team of the Spartak voluntary sports society.

References
 
Ibrahim Khasanov's profile at Sports Reference.com
Ibragim Khasanov's obituary 

1937 births
2010 deaths
Sportspeople from Dushanbe
Canoeists at the 1960 Summer Olympics
Canoeists at the 1964 Summer Olympics
Olympic canoeists of the Soviet Union
ICF Canoe Sprint World Championships medalists in kayak
Soviet male canoeists
Tajikistani male canoeists
Spartak athletes
Honoured Masters of Sport of the USSR
Merited Coaches of the Soviet Union